It's a Buddy Goode Christmas is the fourth studio album by Michael Carr's comedy character Buddy Goode. It was officially released both digitally and on CD in stores on 22 November 2013.

The album won an ARIA Award in the category of Best Comedy Release at the 2014 ceremony, beating the likes of Chris Lilley's fictional character Ja'mie King, comedy rock band The Beards and stand-up comedian Ronny Chieng.

Track listing

References

External links
Official Website
CD Edition
iTunes Edition

Buddy Goode albums
2013 albums
ARIA Award-winning albums